Christoph Gerber is a titular professor at the Department of Physics, University of Basel, Switzerland. 

Christoph Gerber is the co-inventor of the atomic force microscope. Born in Basel, Switzerland, on 15 May 1942, he was among the 250 most cited living physicists in the world in the year 2000.

Christoph Gerber is a titular professor at the Department of Physics, University of Basel, Switzerland. He was a founding member and director for scientific communication of the NCCR (National Center of Competence in Research Nanoscale Science). He was formerly a research staff member in nanoscale science at the IBM Research Laboratory in Rueschlikon, Switzerland, and has served as a project leader in various programs of the Swiss National Science Foundation. 

For the past 40 years, his research has been focused on nanoscale science. He is a pioneer in scanning probe microscopy, who made major contributions to the invention of the scanning tunneling microscope, the atomic force microscope (AFM), and AFM techniques in high vacuum and at low temperatures. 

He is the author and co-author of more than 175 scientific papers that have appeared in peer-reviewed journals and has been cited approximately 58'000 times in cross-disciplinary fields. He belongs to the one hundred worldwide most cited researchers in Physical Sciences. He has given numerous plenary and invited talks at international conferences.

His work has been recognized with multiple honorary degrees and various awards and appeared in numerous articles in daily press and TV coverage. 2016 he has been awarded the Kavli Prize in Nanoscience together with Gerd Binnig and Calvin Quate for the Scanning Force Microscope. He became a fellow of the Norwegian Academy of Science and Letters. He is a Fellow of the American Physical Society and a Fellow of the Institute of Physics UK. His IP portfolio contains 37 patents and patent publications. 

His current interests include
 Biochemical sensors based on AFM Technology
 Chemical surface identification on the nanometer scale with AFM
 Nanomechanics, nanorobotics, molecular devices at the ultimate limits of measurement and fabrication
 Atomic force microscopy research on insulators
 Self-organization and self-assembly at the nanometer scale

References

External links 
 Prof. Ch. Gerber
 

Academic staff of the University of Basel
Living people
Year of birth missing (living people)
Swiss physicists
Members of the Norwegian Academy of Science and Letters
Kavli Prize laureates in Nanoscience